The Borderline Saints is a rock band from Skåne, Sweden.

Biography 

The Borderline Saints is a rock band formed on January 1, 2009. They released their debut album "F60-F69" in the spring of 2011. Their music is described as alternative power pop, and according to their own description it is " highly characteristic, with catchy riffs that will give you goosebumps, powerful drive that will make the hair on the back of your neck rise, and melodic lyrics in combination with the voices of the two singers complementing each other".
The band made a flying start in their early days, and made it all the way to the regional final of the Emergenza music festival contest. In the regional final competition the band finished 4th. In 2010 the band teamed up with bands Artmade, Classified Drama and Zoma Cruz and went on tour in the south region of Sweden. The tour was called A.C.T.Z. Rock Tour. At this point the band had also got signed by independent record label Ktown records. The tour took the band to the famous club Slagthuset in Malmö, amongst other venues.

Behind the scene 

The band are locally known for their "do it yourself"-attitude, 
having built their own in-house studio where they record, mix 
and master their music on their own. (Sonart studio) 
Guitarist AC also started his own label in order to release the 
music, Rockstar re:chords.

Discography 
For credits & lyrics goto theborderlinesaints.com/discography

Albums
 Anger Management (2013)
 F60-F69 (2011)
EPs
 Straitjackets & the usual medication (2012)
 Tear Down These Walls... (2010)

The EP "Tear down these walls" was a preview of the debut album "F60-F69", the latter being a 12-song strong album with a variety of styles. The songs and genres crossing from rock influenced by punk and heavy metal to softer pop and ballads."Straitjackets & the usual medication" saw the introduction of Platon on keyboards/piano which opened new doors for the band and widened their sound. The EP reaped some fine reviews (see reviews listed below) leaving audience and journalists craving for more.''
Both "F60-F69" and "Straitjackets & the usual medication" was released on Spotify and iTunes.

Collaborations 
In 2012 The Borderline Saints teamed up with Danish electronic music producer Dishy and released dance versions of both "Cut by an angel"  and "Cruel world" on Spotify and iTunes. 
After the release of "Straitjackets & the usual medication" sign language artists Vega & Sofie made a trademark sign language music video for "Cheers".

In the media 
Media interest is steadily rising, below listing some of the articles:

Articles 
 Article about the A.C.T.Z tour 2010
 Article about the A.C.T.Z tour 2010
 Gallery at Festivalphoto festivalphoto.se
 http://www.e-pages.dk/landskrona/68/28
 Blog about TBS gig
 Article about the band's birth & early days

Reviews 
 Review of "Straitjackets & the usual medication" on Hallowed.se
 Review of "Straitjackets & the usual medication" at Rocksverige.se
 Review of "Straitjackets & the usual medication" at Zinken musik 
 Review at hardrockinfo.com

External links 
Official website
TBS Facebook page
TBS on YouTube
Sonart Productions
Rockstar Re:chords

References 

Swedish rock music groups
Musical groups established in 2009
Power pop groups